Anselmo Citterio (19 May 1927 – 2 October 2006) was an Italian cyclist. He was born in the Desio. He won a silver medal in team pursuit at the 1948 Summer Olympics in London, together with Rino Pucci, Arnaldo Benfenati and Guido Bernardi.

References

External links
 
 

1927 births
2006 deaths
People from Desio
Italian male cyclists
Cyclists at the 1948 Summer Olympics
Olympic cyclists of Italy
Olympic silver medalists for Italy
Olympic medalists in cycling
Medalists at the 1948 Summer Olympics
Cyclists from the Province of Monza e Brianza